The men's 4 × 100 metre freestyle relay competition of the swimming events at the 2015 Pan American Games took place on July 14 at the CIBC Pan Am/Parapan Am Aquatics Centre and Field House in Toronto, Canada. The defending Pan American Games champion is Brazil.

This race consisted of eight lengths of the pool. Each of the four swimmers completed two lengths of the pool. The first swimmer had to touch the wall before the second could leave the starting block.

Records
Prior to this competition, the existing world and Pan American Games records were as follows:

The following new records were set during this competition.

Schedule

All times are Eastern Time Zone (UTC-4).

Results

Heats
The first round was held on July 14.
As only seven teams had entered, the heats served as a ranking round with all seven teams advancing to the final.

Final 
The final was held on July 14.

References

Swimming at the 2015 Pan American Games
4 × 100 metre freestyle relay